Congress Square Park is a small public park in the Arts District of Portland, Maine. The park includes a stage for performances and areas for sitting. It is also home to a large, historic clock which had previously been located at Union Station.

History
The park was created in 1982 with an urban development grant from the United States Department of Housing and Urban Development. In 2013, the city, led by Mayor Michael F. Brennan and City Manager Jon Jennings sought to sell the park to Rockbridge Capital, which was renovating the adjacent hotel. However, residents (led by the Friends of Congress Square Park) drafted an ordinance which prevented the sale until a vote could occur. After collecting a sufficient number of signatures, the sale was postponed until after a June 2014 referendum. In that election, voters endorsed their initiative, which prevented the sale of the public and added protections to the further sale of public spaces.

Since 2013, the Friends of Congress Square Park has organized events, raised funds on behalf of, and maintained the park. In 2018, the city received a $33,000 grant for a public art project in the park.

References

External links

 Congress Square Park portlandmaine.gov
 Friends of Congress Square Park

Parks in Portland, Maine
1982 establishments in Maine
Parks established in 1982
Urban public parks